ETR 470 (ElettroTreno 470) is a high-speed tilting electric multiple unit, which is now only operated by the Greek company, Hellenic Train. Introduced in September 1996, nine units were built  for the Italo-Swiss firm Cisalpino. They were made by Fiat Ferroviaria (now Alstom), and could tilt up to 8°. Today, there are five trains in Greece.

Prior to their arrival in Greece, they performed services under the name Frecciabianca.

Specifications 
They can accommodate a total of 475 passengers, and also have a restaurant. They were designed by the Italian Giugiaro. They were initially designed for 3kV DC and 15kV 16.7 Hz AC operation, had four pantographs, as well as a tilting mechanism, accommodating a tilt of up to 8 degrees.

Interiors

History
The 9 trainsets were built between 1993 and 1996 and were originally owned by the Swiss Cisalpino. In total, they cost 16.85 million euros each.

Part of the Pendolino family, it was an updated version of the ETR 460 adapted for services under lines electrified at 3 kV DC in Italy and at 15 kV 16.7 Hz AC in Switzerland and Germany. ETR 470 trains were used for fast services between Italy and Switzerland.

Nine sets of nine coaches each were built, together with a 3-car prototype ("Train 0") which has never been used for commercial service. Since the dissolution of Cisalpino they were split between SBB (4 sets) and Trenitalia (5 sets). SBB planned to retire its 4 sets in 2014 at the latest.

Because of its long series of breakdowns, the ETR.470 was very poorly received in Switzerland. The maintenance costs were four times higher compared to the ICN. The final decision to retire the trains was taken after one of them caught fire on 17 May 2009 in Ambrì. The spokesperson for the Swiss Association for Transport and Environment described them as "not worthy of the Swiss Federal Railways", while the chief executive of Swiss Federal Railways said he wanted to "put an end to this horror". After unsuccessful attempts by SBB to sell the trains, three Swiss ETR 470 trainsets were scrapped in November 2015. ETR 470 009 owned by SBB has been leased to Trenitalia since 31 March 2017 after an Italian ETR 610 has been very seriously damaged in an accident (derailment) in Lucerne on 22 March 2017.

Export
Before 2021, the Italian ETR.470 were used for Frecciabianca high-speed services. It was decided in 2019, that these will be used on the Athens – Thessaloniki railway line run by Ferrovie dello Stato Italiane subsidiary, TrainOSE. Units will be converted for use in Greece, the existing 3 kV DC equipment is to be replaced with 25 kV 50 Hz equipment and they will be fitted with ETCS onboard equipment. In August 2018, a similar ETR.485 unit transferred to Greece for testing purposes, in anticipation of the ETR 470 fleet's arrival, but because it was not designed for the Greek network, it was decided instead to launch the ETR 470, which were originally expected to come in 2019, with the completion of the electrification and testing of the ETCS. However, in February 2020, with the TRAINOSE depot not yet ready to receive them delivery was delayed. Instead of arriving in the summer of 2020, delivery was postponed until the end of 2020 or the beginning of 2021. The delivery was delayed even further, so the first unit was scheduled to arrive on 18 January 2021 in Thessaloniki via a route from Piacenza. The first train ETR 470, on 10/1/2021 finished the control tests and on 12/1/2021 departed from Milan for Thessaloniki, where it arrived on 16/1/2021, two days ahead of schedule. Three trains arrived in Greece in 2021, the fourth in January 2022. On May 15th, 2022 the trains started operating on the connection between Thessaloniki and Athens.

Liveries

Original livery 
The original livery included green, black and blue horizontal stripes and red elements below the front, all on white surface, which covered most of the vehicles.

Second livery 
This colouring consists of a blue wavy stripe on the side in silver colour, while the red elements were kept under the front from the previous livery. This livery is still used today, in some variations with the logos of the newer companies (ie CIS and FS.)

Third livery 
Hellenic train uses Etr 470 trains in Greece in new livery.

See also
New Pendolino
Treno Alta Velocità
List of high speed trains

References

External links

High-speed trains of Italy
Pendolino
ETR 470
3000 V DC multiple units
15 kV AC multiple units
25 kV AC multiple units
Passenger trains running at least at 250 km/h in commercial operations